The Senior women's race at the 1981 IAAF World Cross Country Championships was held in Madrid, Spain, at the Hipódromo de la Zarzuela on March 28, 1981.   A report on the event was given in the Glasgow Herald.

Complete results, medallists, 
 and the results of British athletes were published.

Race results

Senior women's race (4.41 km)

Individual

Teams

Note: Athletes in parentheses did not score for the team result

Participation
An unofficial count yields the participation of 118 athletes from 22 countries in the Senior women's race.  This is in agreement with the official numbers as published.

 (6)
 (6)
 (6)
 (6)
 (6)
 (6)
 (4)
 (6)
 (6)
 (1)
 (6)
 (6)
 (6)
 (6)
 (6)
 (1)
 (6)
 (6)
 (6)
 (4)
 (6)
 (6)

See also
 1981 IAAF World Cross Country Championships – Senior men's race
 1981 IAAF World Cross Country Championships – Junior men's race

References

Senior women's race at the World Athletics Cross Country Championships
IAAF World Cross Country Championships
1981 in women's athletics